The 1985 Southwest Conference women's basketball tournament was held March 4–9, 1985, at Moody Coliseum in Dallas, Texas. 

Number 1 seed  defeated 2 seed  82-62 to win their 3rd championship and receive the conference's automatic bid to the 1985 NCAA tournament.

Format and seeding 
The tournament consisted of a 6 team single-elimination tournament. The top two seeds had a bye to the Semifinals. The First round games occurred at campus sites.

Tournament

References 

Southwest Conference women's Basketball Tournament
Basketball in Dallas
1985 in sports in Texas
1985 in women's basketball